Yang Manchun is the name given to the Goguryeo commander of Ansi Fortress in the 640s. Ansi Fortress was located on the Goguryeo–Tang border, probably present-day Haicheng. Yang is sometimes credited with saving the kingdom by his successful defense against Tang Taizong.

Name
The real name of the defender of Ansi Fortress is unclear. Kim Busik, in his Samguk Sagi (Chronicles of the Three Kingdoms), lamented that the name of the steadfast commander of Ansi Fortress was unknown:

However, an author by the name of Xiong Damu from the Ming Dynasty used the name Liang Wanchun (梁萬春) to refer to the defender in his Historical Fiction novel Tangshu Zhizhuan Tongsu Yanyi. During the Japanese invasions of Korea, the Ming generals Wu Zongdao and Li Shifa said to Yun Geunsu that the defender's name is Liang Wanchun. In 1669, Hyeonjong of Joseon asked Song Jungil for his name and he gave his name as Ryang Manchun, the Korean way of pronouncing the Hanja "梁萬春". Jungil replied, 'It was Ryang Manchun. He skillfully checked the army of Taizong and so might we very well call him "seonsu seongja" (선수성자, 善守城者, "capable defender of fortresses").'" However, due to the Korean Pronunciation rule called Tu'eum Beopchik (두음법칙), Ryang Manchun (량만춘) was pronounced as Yang Manchun (양만춘) in some Korean dialects. As such, his name slowly began to be mistakenly interpreted as (楊萬春). In The Jehol Diary written by Park Ji-won in the 18th century includes the following: "When Yang Manchun, the master of Anshi-sŏng Fortress, shot an arrow and put out the eye of the Emperor Taizong of the Tang dynasty, the emperor assembled his army under the wall. This was not the signal for an immediate attack, but to demonstrate the Emperor's generosity in granting Yang Manchun one hundred p'il roll of silk, praising him for defending the Fortress successfully for his own Korean king." In time Yang Manchun came into general use as the name of the defender of Ansi Fortress.

Involvement in the Goguryeo–Tang War

In 642, Yeon Gaesomun killed King Yeongnyu and seized military control over the country. However, although Yeon had quickly gained control over the rest of the country, Yang Manchun refused to surrender Ansi fortress. After a lengthy siege and repeated unsuccessful attempts to storm the fortress, Yeon was forced to withdraw and allow Yang to keep his position as fortress commander. This proved to be to his advantage.

In 645, Taizong led a campaign against Goguryeo. Some Goguryeo border fortresses fell early, but Tang was unable to reduce Ansi fortress. Goguryeo sent a force reported at 150,000 to raise the siege of Ansi fortress, but the force was unable to reach it. Despite its siege of Ansi, the Tang army was unable to force its capitulation. Taizong eventually ordered the construction of a large earthen siege ramp, which Yang instead captured and used as part of his defense. When winter approached, Tang forces were forced to withdraw.

The siege of Ansi fortress is related in detail (but without the commander's name) in the Samguk Sagi, Goguryeo vol. 9. (vol. 21 overall).

In popular culture
 Portrayed by Im Dong-jin in the 2006-2007 KBS TV series Dae Jo Yeong.
 Portrayed by Shin Dong-hoon in 2006-2007 SBS TV series Yeon Gaesomun.
 Portrayed by Joo Jin-mo in the KBS2 TV series The Blade and Petal.
 Portrayed by Jo In-sung in 2018 film The Great Battle

See also
History of Korea
Military history of Goguryeo

Notes 

Military history of Korea
Goguryeo people
Korean generals